Guachipas is a department located in Salta Province, Argentina.

With an area of  it borders to the north and northeast with Metán Department, to the east with the Departments of La Candelaria and Rosario de la Frontera, to the south with Cafayate and Tucumán Province, and to the west with La Viña Department.

Towns and municipalities
 Guachipas
 Alemania
 Cebilar
 Pampa Grande
 Las Juntas

References

External links 

 Departments of Salta Province website

Departments of Salta Province